Georgios Moustakopoulos (born 13 August 1998) is a Greek professional footballer who plays as a defensive midfielder for Super League 2 club Apollon Smyrnis.

References

External links

Giorgos Moustakopoulos at pfc1891.gr

1998 births
Living people
Greek footballers
Greece under-21 international footballers
Greece youth international footballers
Football League (Greece) players
Super League Greece 2 players
Panachaiki F.C. players
Association football midfielders
Footballers from Patras
AEK Athens F.C. B players
Apollon Smyrnis F.C. players